The Challenge Tour is the second-tier men's professional golf tour in Europe. It is operated by the PGA European Tour and, as with the main European Tour and the European Senior Tour, some of the events are played outside Europe.

History
The tour was introduced in 1986, when the national tours of Sweden, France and Italy became open to foreign players, and was initially called the Satellite Tour. The Order of Merit was introduced in 1989, with the top five players on it winning membership of the European Tour for the following season. The following year the tour was renamed the Challenge Tour, a name already used in 1989. Up to 1993 the Challenge Tour rankings were based on each player's best several results, but since 1994 it has been a straightforward money list, with all results counting.

Players who are successful on the Challenge Tour qualify for membership of the European Tour the following year. Twenty players earn direct promotion to the European Tour. Players finishing 21–45 may also gain qualification for occasional low-prize-money European Tour events, but can improve their status through European Tour Qualifying School. Players who win three Challenge Tour events in a season are fast-tracked onto the main tour immediately and are fully exempt the following season, similar to that of the US-based Korn Ferry Tour.

World ranking points
World ranking points are awarded for high finishes in Challenge Tour events. Most events give 12 OWGR points to the winner, with European Tour dual-ranking events awarding 18 points. The Challenge Tour Grand Final gives 17 points to the winner. 

In 2014, a number of events received slightly higher points totals, with three events earning a minimum of 13 points and the Challenge Tour Grand Final winner receiving 17 points, up from 16.

Satellite tours
One competitive level down from the Challenge Tour are four third-level developmental tours, the Alps Tour, the Pro Golf Tour, the PGA EuroPro Tour (ceased in 2022) and the Nordic Golf League, each of which is based in a different part of Europe. These circuits are known as the satellite tours. Each season the top five players (not otherwise exempt) from the Order of Merit of each of these tours earn status on the Challenge Tour for the following season. The Challenge Tour also has an annual qualifying school.

In December 2022, it was announced that the Clutch Pro Tour and the Tartan Pro Tour would become official feeder tours to the Challenge Tour; in place of the now defunct PGA EuroPro Tour. The Tartan Pro Tour would offer Challenge Tour status to the leading player on the Order of Merit, whereas the Clutch Pro Tour would offer Challenge Tour status to the top two players on the Order of Merit.

Schedule

Challenge Tour Rankings winners
The Challenge Tour Rankings have been calculated in Euros since 1999. Prior to that they were calculated in British pounds.

Schedules by year
Originally, the Challenge Tour events were held in Western Europe. In 1991, the five Safari Circuit events in Africa were added. Only the Kenya Open (until 2018) remained a regular event on the tour for more than a few years, although the Zambia Open returned to the tour between 2001 and 2004 as the first Sunshine Tour co-sanctioned event. Another African tournament, the Moroccan Golf Classic, was held from 2002 to 2010. The Challenge Tour featured tournaments co-sanctioned with the Tour de las Américas in Latin America from 2003 to 2011. In 2011, the tour added its first events in Asia, the Gujarat Kensville Challenge in India and the Kazakhstan Open.

The table below summarises the development of the tour since 1999, which was the year that the euro became the currency of record for the tour. Individual tournaments have purses fixed in a mixture of British pounds, euro and U.S. dollars, so year on year changes in the total prize fund reflect exchange rate fluctuations as well as prize fund movements in constant currencies.

See also
List of golfers with most Challenge Tour wins
List of golfers to achieve a three-win promotion from the Challenge Tour

Notes

References

External links

 
Professional golf tours
European international sports competitions